Conor McKeon (born 4 january 1994) is a rugby union player from Ireland. He primarily played fly-half for most of his youth career, before changing to scrum-half at senior level. McKeon played professionally for Irish provincial side Connacht in the Pro14 having come through the team's academy, and played his club rugby for Athlone-based side Buccaneers.

In April 2019, it was announced that McKeon would retire from rugby due to injury. His retirement came at the end of the 2018–19 season aged just 25.

Early life
McKeon was born in Dublin, and grew up in Rathfarnham. He played rugby from a young age, with St Mary's, and also played hurling with Ballyboden St Enda's. McKeon attended Gonzaga College in Ranelagh, where he chose to focus exclusively on rugby. During his time in the college, he played as a fly-half and was part of the school's team in the Leinster Senior Cup. After leaving school, McKeon joined All-Ireland League side Lansdowne. He received his third level education at NUI Galway, where he studied commerce.

Rugby career

Connacht
Having played under-age rugby for his native Leinster, McKeon joined the academy of rival province Connacht in 2014. His second cousin Eoin was already an established part of the senior squad. Despite being part of the Connacht academy, McKeon continued to play for Dublin-based Lansdowne throughout the season, as the team qualified for the All-Ireland League final. McKeon missed the team's victory over Clontarf however, as he made his senior Connacht debut on 9 May 2015, the same day the final took place. He came off the bench against Zebre, kicking two conversions.

In his second season in the academy, McKeon joined the Athlone-based Connacht Branch club Buccaneers. He made his second appearance for the province against Zebre. Ahead of the 2016–17 season, McKeon was converted from a fly-half to a scrum-half by the Connacht coaches. Although he did not make any first team appearances during his third year in the academy, but was named the province's Academy Player of the Year, helped Buccaneers earn promotion to the top flight of the AIL and earned a senior contract for the following season.

In his first season as a senior player, McKeon made just one appearance, playing off the bench in the 2017–18 Pro14 game against the Cheetahs. In the 2018–19 season he made his European debut, coming off the bench against Bordeaux Bègles in the Challenge Cup.
In that game however, McKeon suffered a serious shoulder injury. No time-frame was given for his return to competitive action. In April 2019, it was announced that McKeon would retire from the game at the end of the season due to his ongoing struggles with injury.

International
McKeon has represented Ireland internationally at under-age level. His performances for Gonzaga saw him called up to the Ireland schools team for the European Under-18 Championship in 2012, where he was starting out-half of the side that finished as runners-up in the competition. The following year, he was part of the under-19 team. McKeon was part of Mike Ruddock's Ireland under-20 team for the 2014 Six Nations Under 20s Championship. He made appearances in all five of the team's games in the tournament, scoring one penalty against France. McKeon was also named in the squad for Junior World Championship later that year. He was kept out of the starting side by Ross Byrne but appeared from the bench in all five of Ireland's games, scoring eight points, as the team finished fourth.

References

External links
Connacht profile
EPCR profile
Ireland under-20 profile
Pro14 profile

1994 births
Living people
Alumni of the University of Galway
Ballyboden St Enda's hurlers
Buccaneers RFC players
Connacht Rugby players
Irish rugby union players
Lansdowne Football Club players
Rugby union players from Dublin (city)
Rugby union scrum-halves
Sportspeople from Dublin (city)
People from Rathfarnham